North Starr is a 2008 film directed by Matthew Stanton.

It was scheduled to compete in the Dramatic Competition at the 2008 Sundance Film Festival.

Plot
A young African American man living in Houston witnesses his best friend's brutal murder, then flees to the small, racially intolerant, backwater town of Trublin.

Cast
 Jerome Hawkins as Demetrious
 Matthew Stanton as Darring Clements
 Chris Sullivan as Sprit
 Isaac Lamb as T.J.
 Zack Johnson as Justin
 Wayne Campbell as Wayne

Reception
Justin Chang of Variety described the movie as "a messy Texas stew of racial tension, personal liberation and murder-in-retrospect detective story." He praised the likable characters but criticized the "self-indulgent" first-time director's work. James Greenberg of The Hollywood Reporter called it "long on passion and somewhat lacking in execution," stressing the lack of experience on the part of the producer-director-writer-actor Matthew Stanton.

References

External links
 

American drama films
2008 films
2008 drama films
2000s English-language films
2000s American films